Jone Salinas (8 March 1918 – 27 May 1992) was an Italian film actress. She was married to the producer Antonio Musu.

Filmography

References

Bibliography
 Goble, Alan. The Complete Index to Literary Sources in Film. Walter de Gruyter, 1999.

External links

1918 births
1992 deaths
Italian film actresses
People from Reggio Calabria